Region 7 or Region VII can refer to:

 One of DVD region
 One of health regions of Canada managed by Horizon Health Network
 Former Region 7 (Johannesburg), an administrative district in the city of Johannesburg, South Africa, from 2000 to 2006
 Region 7 National Canoe Base
 Maule Region, Chile
 Central Visayas, Philippines
 Northwestern Regional School District No. 7

Region name disambiguation pages